The 2008 Wagner Seahawks football team represented Wagner College in the 2008 NCAA Division I FCS football season as a member of the Northeast Conference (NEC). The Seahawks were led by 28th-year head coach Walt Hameline and played their home games at Wagner College Stadium. Wagner finished the season 3–7 overall and 1–6 in NEC play to place seventh.

Schedule

References

Wagner
Wagner Seahawks football seasons
Wagner Seahawks football